Julius Hotchkiss (July 11, 1810 – December 23, 1878) was a United States representative from Connecticut. He was born in Waterbury, Connecticut, the son of Woodward and Polly (Castle) Hotchkiss, Prospect farmers. At seventeen, he taught in Prospect schools. He later moved to Waterbury and ran a store and a factory that made cotton webbing and suspenders.

Personal life 
In 1832, he married Melissa Perkins (of Oxford) with whom he had five children and were members of The New Church.

Public office 
Hotchkiss was nominated by both parties to be the first Mayor of Waterbury in 1853 when it was incorporated, shifting to the Democratic Party when the Whigs had dissolved. In 1851 and 1858, he served as a member of the Connecticut House of Representatives. He was elected as a Democrat to the Fortieth Congress (March 4, 1867 – March 3, 1869). After leaving Congress, he was the 55th Lieutenant Governor of Connecticut in 1870. He died in Middletown in 1878 and was buried in Pine Grove Cemetery.

References

1810 births
1878 deaths
Mayors of Waterbury, Connecticut
Members of the Connecticut House of Representatives
Lieutenant Governors of Connecticut
Democratic Party members of the United States House of Representatives from Connecticut
Connecticut Whigs
19th-century American politicians
People from Prospect, Connecticut